Greg Grandin (born 1962) is a professor of history at Yale University. He previously taught at New York University. He is author of a number of books, including Fordlândia: The Rise and Fall of Henry Ford's Forgotten Jungle City, which was a finalist for the Pulitzer Prize for History, as well as for the National Book Award and a National Book Critics Circle Award. A more recent book, entitled, Who Is Rigoberta Menchú?, focuses on the treatment of the Guatemalan Nobel Peace Prize winner.  His 2014 book, The Empire of Necessity: Slavery, Freedom, and Deception in the New World, is a study of the factual basis for the novella Benito Cereno by Herman Melville.

Fordlandia was named one of the best books of the year by The New York Times, The New Yorker; NPR; The Boston Globe; San Francisco Chronicle; and the Chicago Tribune.

In 2020, Grandin was awarded a Pulitzer Prize for General Nonfiction for The End of the Myth: From the Frontier to the Border Wall in the Mind of America.

Biography
Grandin received a B.A. from Brooklyn College in 1992 and a Ph.D. from Yale University in 1999.

He won the Latin American Studies Association's Bryce Wood Award for the best book published in any discipline on Latin America for Blood of Guatemala: A History of Race and Nation.
Eric Hobsbawm called The Last Colonial Massacre a "remarkable and extremely well-written work" that

is about more than the dark history of Guatemala and the Cold War in Latin America. It is about how common people discover politics. It is about the roots of democracy and those of genocide. It is about the hopes and defeats of the twentieth-century left. I could not put this book down.

Grandin has published widely on US foreign policy, the Cold War, and Latin American politics in The Nation, The New York Times, Harpers, and the London Review of Books. He has appeared on the Charlie Rose Show and has interviewed Naomi Klein and Hugo Chávez.

After the death of Chávez, Grandin published a lengthy obituary in The Nation, opining that "the biggest problem Venezuela faced during his rule was not that Chávez was authoritarian but that he wasn't authoritarian enough."

In the summer of 2009, he reported from Honduras on that country's coup, appearing a number of times on Democracy Now! and Grit TV and writing a series of reports in The Nation and elsewhere on the consequences of the overthrow of Honduran president Manuel Zelaya.

Grandin worked as a consultant with the Historical Clarification Commission (Spanish: Comisión para el Esclarecimiento Histórico, or CEH), the Guatemalan truth commission, and has written a number of articles on its methodology, including its genocide ruling and its use of historical analysis.

Grandin was elected to the American Academy of Arts and Sciences in April 2010.

Selected works

Author
 
 
 

Who Is Rigoberta Menchu?, Verso, 2011, 
 The Empire of Necessity: Slavery, Freedom, and Deception in the New World, Metropolitan Books, 2014, 
 Kissinger's Shadow: The Long Reach of America's Most Controversial Statesman, Metropolitan Books, 2015, 
 "The Strange Career of American Exceptionalism", The Nation, January 2/9, 2017, pp. 22–27.
The End of the Myth: From the Frontier to the Border Wall in the Mind of America, Metropolitan Books, 2019,

Editor

References

External links
 Greg Grandin website 
 Greg Grandin articles for The Nation'
 
 Appearances on Democracy Now!''

Latin Americanists
Historians of Latin America
Fellows of the American Academy of Arts and Sciences
1962 births
Living people
New York University faculty
Brooklyn College alumni
Yale University alumni
The Nation (U.S. magazine) people
Pulitzer Prize for General Non-Fiction winners
Bancroft Prize winners